Christopher Leyton Keey (born 27 December 1969) is a South African-born English former cricketer.

Keey was born at Johannesburg in December 1969. He emigrated to England as a child, where he was educated at Harrow School, before going up to Keble College, Oxford. While studying at Oxford, he made his debut in first-class cricket for Oxford University against Worcestershire at Oxford in 1992. He played first-class cricket for Oxford until 1993, making a total of seventeen appearances. In his seventeen matches for Oxford, he scored a total of 612 runs at an average of 24.48. His highest score of 111, which was his only first-class century, came against Northamptonshire in 1993. He also made a single first-class appearance for a combined Oxford and Cambridge Universities cricket team against the touring Pakistanis in 1992. In addition to playing first-class cricket while at Oxford, he also made a single List A one-day appearance for the Combined Universities cricket team against Hampshire in the 1993 Benson & Hedges Cup, during which he was dismissed for a single run by Shaun Udal.

References

External links

1969 births
Living people
Cricketers from Johannesburg
South African emigrants to the United Kingdom
People educated at Harrow School
Alumni of Durham University
Alumni of Keble College, Oxford
English cricketers
Oxford University cricketers
Oxford and Cambridge Universities cricketers
British Universities cricketers